Alex Clayton (born 23 November 1987) is an American tennis player.

Clayton has a career high ATP singles ranking of 796 achieved on 10 July 2006. He also has a career high ATP doubles ranking of 759 achieved on 27 November 2006.

Clayton won the 2005 US Open – Boys' doubles title with Donald Young.

Clayton played college tennis at Stanford University.

Junior Grand Slam titles

Doubles: 1 (1 title)

References

External links

1987 births
Living people
American male tennis players
Sportspeople from Fort Lauderdale, Florida
Sportspeople from Bradenton, Florida
US Open (tennis) junior champions
Stanford Cardinal men's tennis players
Grand Slam (tennis) champions in boys' doubles
Tennis people from Florida